Donglingjing railway station is a railway station on the Shijiazhuang–Taiyuan high-speed railway in Yangqu County, Taiyuan, Shanxi, China.

Railway stations in Shanxi
Stations on the Qingdao–Taiyuan High-Speed Railway